Joshua Bishop (born 30 May 2000) is a Barbadian cricketer. He made his List A debut for the West Indies Under-19s in the 2016–17 Regional Super50 on 25 January 2017. In July 2017, he was named U-19 Cricketer of the Year by the West Indies Players' Association. In August 2019, Cricket West Indies named him as the Under-19 Player of the Year. He made his Twenty20 debut on 20 September 2019, for the Barbados Tridents, in the 2019 Caribbean Premier League. In October 2019, he was selected to play for Barbados in the 2019–20 Regional Super50 tournament.

In July 2020, he was named in the Barbados Tridents squad for the 2020 Caribbean Premier League.

References

External links
 

2000 births
Living people
Barbadian cricketers
Barbados cricketers
Barbados Royals cricketers
West Indies under-19 cricketers
Place of birth missing (living people)